This article concerns the period 179 BC – 170 BC.

References